The 1987 UAAP men's basketball tournament was the 50th year of the men's tournament of the University Athletic Association of the Philippines (UAAP)'s basketball championship. Hosted by Ateneo de Manila University, the Ateneo Blue Eagles defeated the UE Red Warriors in the finals taking their first UAAP men's basketball championship after transferring from the NCAA (Philippines) in 1978.

Tournament format 
 Double round robin; the two teams with the best records advance Finals:
 The #1 seed will only need to win once to clinch the championship.
 The #2 seed has to win twice to clinch the championship.

Elimination round 

Fedencio Oblina of the University of Santo Tomas (UST) was found to be ineligible as he failed his NCEE examinations. The board then forfeited all of UST's win where Oblina played, with the Goldies going from a 6–3 record (tied for third) to a 2–7 record, at seventh place ahead of winless National University (NU). The forfeitures benefited Adamson, Ateneo and Far Eastern University (FEU): Ateneo found themselves at the top of the standings with an 8–1 record. A source of the Manila Standard newspaper confirmed that while Oblina failed the NCEE twice, he passed it on 1985.

NU won their first game in six years with an 89–75 win over the University of the Philippines (UP) squad that was shorthanded by injuries. Their win snapped their nine-game losing streak during the season. Meanwhile, the UAAP Board confirmed that Oblina has been meted with a lifetime ban.

Finals
Number 1 seed Ateneo only has to win once, while number 2 seed UE has to win twice, to clinch the championship.

With Ateneo center Danny Francisco sitting out the game due to a lung ailment, University of the East (UE) started the game strong, taking a 51–38 lead at halftime. After the Warriors extended their lead to twenty points at 83–63, Ateneo came alive and had a 22–2 run sparked by a three-point shot by Joseph Kenneth Nieto to tie the game at 85–all. Nieto and Gilbert Reyes scored for Ateneo to give them the 92–86 lead. UE tied the score anew at 92–all after free-throws from Bernie Villarias, Conrado Barilo and Modesto Hojilla, but on the succeeding possession, a driving Emilio Chuatico was blocked by Hojilla who was called for an intentional foul. After Chuatico split his free-throws and Ateneo retaining possession, the Blue Eagles dribbled the time until a driving Eric Reyes was fouled by Jerry Codiñera with three seconds left. Reyes ended the game by splitting his free-throws, and giving Ateneo their first UAAP championship.

See also
NCAA Season 63 basketball tournaments

References

50
1987 in Philippine basketball